The name “Technicolor Adventure” was used by Warner Bros. to define its one-reel (mostly 9-10 minutes in length) film shorts that were not part of the Sports Parade, also shot in Technicolor in the 1940s. Most were travelogues or human interest documentary films. Gordon Hollingshead produced most of them, with music scores provided by Howard Jackson.

List of films by title / major credits (not complete) / release date or copyright date (marked ©) / notes:

See also
List of short subjects by Hollywood studio#Warner Brothers
Travelogue (films)

References
 Liebman, Roy Vitaphone Films – A Catalogue of the Features and Shorts 2003 McFarland & Company
 Motion Pictures 1940-1949 Catalog of Copyright Entries 1953 Library of Congress
BoxOffice back issue scans

Documentary film series
Warner Bros. short films